The Dorset Biological Warfare Experiments were a series of experiments conducted between 1953 and 1975 to determine the extent to which a single ship or aircraft could dispense biological warfare agents over the United Kingdom. The tests between 1971–1975 were known as the DICE trials.  The tests were conducted by scientists from Porton Down, initially using zinc cadmium sulfide (ZnCds) as a simulated agent. Early results clearly showed that one aircraft flying along the coast while spraying its agent could contaminate a target over 100 miles away, over an area of 10,000 square miles. This method of biological warfare attack and the test program to study it was known as the Large Area Coverage (LAC) concept.

In the early 1960s, Porton Down was asked to expand the scope of their tests to determine if using a live bacteria instead of ZnCds would significantly alter the results. Scientists from Microbiological Research Establishment at Porton Down selected South Dorset as the site for this next phase of testing, with Bacillus subtilis (also known as Bacillus globigii or BG) selected as the test agent.

This bacteria was sprayed across South Dorset without the knowledge or consent of the inhabitants.

Similar tests

In Operation Sea-Spray, unsuspecting inhabitants of the San Francisco Bay Area were sprayed with Serratia marcescens and Bacillus globigii, pathogens that were then implicated in some unusual outbreaks of illness, including pneumonia, and urinary tract infections, and even some deaths.

In Senate subcommittee hearings in 1977, the US Army revealed: 
 Between 1949 and 1969 open-air tests of biological agents were conducted 239 times. In 80 of those experiments, the Army said it used live bacteria that its researchers at the time thought were harmless. In the others, it used inert chemicals to simulate bacteria.
 In the 1950s army researchers dispersed Serratia on Panama City and Key West Florida with no known illnesses resulting. 
 In the 1950s army researchers dispersed zinc cadmium sulfide (now a known cancer-causing agent) over Minnesota and other Midwestern states to see how far they would spread in the atmosphere. The particles were detected more than 1,000 miles away in New York state. 
 Bacillus globigii, never shown to be harmful to people, was released in San Francisco, New York, Washington, D.C., and along the Pennsylvania Turnpike, among other places. 
 In New York, military researchers in 1966 spread Bacillus subtilis variant Niger, also believed to be harmless, in the subway system by dropping lightbulbs filled with the bacteria onto tracks in stations in midtown Manhattan. The bacteria were carried for miles throughout the subway system. Army officials concluded in a January 1968 report that: "Similar covert attacks with a pathogenic disease-causing agent during peak traffic periods could be expected to expose large numbers of people to infection and subsequent illness or death."
 In a May 1965 secret release of Bacillus globigii at Washington's National Airport and its Greyhound Lines bus terminal more than 130 passengers were exposed to the bacteria traveling to 39 cities in seven states in the two weeks following the mock attack.

See also
Unethical human experimentation in the United States
Project SHAD
Operation Dew
Suffield Experimental Station
Dugway Proving Ground

References

Biological warfare
Science and technology in Dorset
United Kingdom biological weapons program